The 2009 FAI Cup Final was the final match of the 2009 FAI Cup and was contested by Sligo Rovers and Sporting Fingal. Fingal were 2–1 winners in only their second year in the League of Ireland.
The game took place at the Tallaght Stadium on 22 November 2009. Alan Kelly refereed the game in front of 8,105 people.

Match details

References

Final
FAI Cup finals
Fai Cup Final 2009
Fai Cup Final 2009